Tom Carroll (born 14 October 1939) is a former Australian rules footballer who played for the Carlton Football Club in the Victorian Football League (VFL).

Nicknamed 'Turkey Tom' because of his family's turkey farm near Ganmain in the Riverina region and was playing full forward for Ganmain in 1956 and kicked over 100 goals in 1960 for Ganmain and initially played with Carlton on six day permits in 1961.

Carroll was the first Carlton player since Harry Vallence to lead the VFL's goalkicking at the end of a home-and-away season, scoring 54 goals in 1961 and later being awarded the Coleman Medal after it was decided that the medal should be retrospectively given to the VFL leading goalkickers in the home-and-away season dating back to 1955.

Carroll led Carlton's goalkicking again in 1962, and played a key part in a dramatic finals campaign which involved a Preliminary final draw and an infamously narrow escape in the replay against  to qualify for the 1962 VFL Grand Final against . Carroll had a day to forget, being held goalless as the Bombers dashed out to an early lead at quarter time and won easily.

Carroll's VFL career came to a premature end, deciding to return to the family farm after the 1963 VFL season at the age of 24.

Carroll was the leading goalkicker in the South West Football League (New South Wales) in 1964 (102) goals and 1965 (98) goals, with Ganmain Football Club. He was their captain-coach from 1964 to 1966 and were premiers in 1964 and 1965.

In 1988 he moved with his three children to Albury, where he worked as a plant operator with the Albury Council and coached North Albury's Under 18 football team. He is the younger brother of Laurie Carroll and an uncle of former  captain, Dennis Carroll.

References

External links

Tom Carroll at Blueseum
Vision of Tom Carroll playing for Carlton

1939 births
Living people
Australian rules footballers from New South Wales
Carlton Football Club players
Coleman Medal winners